The following article presents a summary of the 1972 football (soccer) season in Brazil, which was the 71st season of competitive football in the country.

Campeonato Brasileiro Série A

Semifinals

Final

Palmeiras declared as the Campeonato Brasileiro champions.

Campeonato Brasileiro Série B

Second Stage

Group E

Group F

Final

Sampaio Corrêa declared as the Campeonato Brasileiro Série B champions.

Promotion
No club was promoted to the following year's first level.

State championship champions

Youth competition champions

Other competition champions

Brazilian clubs in international competitions

Brazil national team
The following table lists all the games played by the Brazil national football team in official competitions and friendly matches during 1972.

References

 Brazilian competitions at RSSSF
 1972 Brazil national team matches at RSSSF

 
Seasons in Brazilian football
Brazil